The 2001–02 Meistriliiga season was the 12th season of the Meistriliiga, the top level of ice hockey in Estonia. Nine teams participated in the league, and Tartu Valk 494 won the championship.

First round

Tallinn Group

Viru Group

Final round

Playoffs

Semifinals 
 HK Vipers - HK Narva 2000 1:6/3:7
 HK Karud - Tartu Välk 494 3:9/2:8

3rd place 
 HK Karud - HK Vipers 3:4

Final 
 Tartu Välk 494 - HK Narva 2000 7:1/4:2

External links
Season on hockeyarchives.info

Meistriliiga
Meist
Meistriliiga (ice hockey) seasons